Niklas Svedberg (born 4 September 1989) is a Swedish professional ice hockey goaltender currently playing under contract with the Fischtown Pinguins of the Deutsche Eishockey Liga (DEL). He won a Swedish championship title in 2012 with Brynäs IF.

Playing career
On 29 May 2012, the Boston Bruins announced that they had signed Svedberg from the Swedish Elite League to an Entry Level Contract. Svedberg made his AHL debut on 19 October 2012 against the Manchester Monarchs. Svedberg was called up to the Boston Bruins on 24 May 2013. Svedberg was also voted as the AHL 2012–13 goalie of the year.

Svedberg made his NHL debut on 2 January 2014 in a home game against the Nashville Predators, playing all 60:50 of game time into a short overtime, resulting in a 3-2 Bruins win.

After the Bruins were eliminated by the Montreal Canadiens in the 2014 Stanley Cup playoffs, on 23 June 2014 Svedberg was signed to a one-year, one-way contract by the Bruins, in anticipation of 2013–14 Bruins backup goaltender Chad Johnson becoming an unrestricted free agent. He appeared in 18 games with the Bruins over the course of the season, collecting 7 wins

As a restricted free agent after his first year as the Bruins backup in the 2014–15 season, Svedberg opted to sign a one-year KHL contract with Russian club, Salavat Yulaev Ufa on 10 May 2015. After leading all KHL goaltenders in games won during 2015–16, he re-signed a two-year contract extension with Salavat.

Sveberg was released from the final year of his contract with Salavat in order to return to the NHL ranks, agreeing to a one-year, two-way contract as a free agent with the Minnesota Wild on 1 July 2017. In the 2017–18 season within the Wild organization, Svedberg was assigned for the duration of the year to AHL affiliate, the Iowa Wild. In 44 appearances he compiled 18 wins with 18 losses.

On June 8, 2018, Svedberg as an impending free agent signed a two-year contract to return to Sweden with Timrå IK in the SHL. In the 2018–19 season, Svedberg registered just 10 wins in 35 games with Timrå IK, unable to keep the club from suffering relegation to the Allsvenskan.

In order to continue in the SHL, Svedberg left Timrå IK and agreed to join original hometown junior club, Djurgårdens IF for the final year of his contract on 7 June 2019.

Career statistics

References

External links

1989 births
Living people
Boston Bruins players
Brynäs IF players
Djurgårdens IF Hockey players
Fischtown Pinguins players
Iowa Wild players
Modo Hockey players
People from Sollentuna Municipality
Providence Bruins players
Salavat Yulaev Ufa players
Swedish expatriate ice hockey people
Swedish ice hockey goaltenders
Timrå IK players
Undrafted National Hockey League players
Sportspeople from Stockholm County